Montazeri Technical University of Mashhad also known as Mashhad Institute of Technology is one of the oldest and largest public technical university in Iran under the supervision of the Ministry of Science, Research and Technology and Technical and Vocational University. At the end of June 2013, Montazeri Technical University of Mashhad was introduced as "The nation's premier center of Technical college among 167 colleges in Iran".

History
Shahid Mohammad Montazeri Technical and Vocational University, one of the oldest and largest public technical university in Iran, was established in 1967. It is a technical and vocational training center. The university and the Ministry of Science, Research and Technology accepts associate and bachelor's degree students.
In the evaluation of the technical and vocational University in the academic year of 2012/2013, in the four educational, cultural, student, and physical education fields, Shahid Mohammad Montazeri ranked first among 167 campuses on the basis of performance evaluation indicators. At the end of June 2013, Shahid Mohammad Montazeri campus was introduced as "national premier center". According to the Council for the Extension of Higher Education of the Ministry of Science, Research and Technology, this faculty was officially promoted to the Technical and Vocational University of Mashhad on 24.12.2015

Faculties

Bachelor's
 Instrumentation control engineering
 HVAC engineering
 Power engineering
 Electronic engineering
 Computer software
 Quality control
 Civil engineering
 Facilities engineering
 Accountancy
 Sports science
 Auto-mechanics
 Architecture
 Mechanical / manufacturing engineering

References

External links
 Official website
 Iranian Society of Instrumentation and Control Engineers

Universities in Iran
1967 establishments in Iran
Campuses
Buildings and structures in Mashhad
Education in Razavi Khorasan Province